Strange Things is the third album by Tackhead, released in 1990 through SBK Records.

Critical reception

The St. Petersburg Times wrote that "Tackhead combines speed metal, groove-drenched dub, wah-wah guitar, acidic rap, dreamy new age and punched-up industrial to such dazzling effect that Strange Things is almost incomprehensibly complex." The Chicago Tribune determined that "Fowler's gritty voice ... and the rigid four-on-the-floor drumming are prominent in the mix, with guitars, bass and Sherwood's odd scraps of sampled sound adding tonal color."

Track listing

Personnel
Tackhead
Bernard Fowler – vocals
Keith LeBlanc – drums
Skip McDonald – guitar, vocals
Adrian Sherwood – effects, percussion
Doug Wimbish – bass guitar, vocals
Production and additional personnel
Susie Davis – keyboards on "Wolf in Sheeps Clothing"
Lisa Fischer – backing vocals
Mick Jagger – harmonica on "Take a Stroll"
Me Company – illustrations
Melle Mel – vocals on "See the Fire Burning"
Cindy Mizelle – backing vocals
Eddie Monsoon – photography
Jill Mumford – design
Tackhead – producer, mixing

References

External links 
 

Tackhead albums
1990 albums
SBK Records albums